Mesestola brochieri is a species of beetle in the family Cerambycidae. It was described by Touroult in 2007.

References

Calliini
Beetles described in 2007